South Trenton is a neighborhood located within the city of Trenton in Mercer County, in the U.S. state of New Jersey. It is home to Italian Americans, Latin Americans, Irish Americans and their descendants. South Trenton borders Hamilton Township to the southeast and the Delaware River to the west. It had a brief existence as an independent municipality from 1840 to 1851.

South Trenton was incorporated as a borough by an act of the New Jersey Legislature on February 28, 1840, from portions of Nottingham Township. The borough was annexed by Trenton on April 14, 1851.

South Trenton is home to Trenton's Chambersburg neighborhood also known as The 'Burg'. Its population includes a large immigrant community from  Poland, Slovakia, Ireland, Hungary, Ukraine, and Germany, though eventually mostly Italian immigrants and their offspring came to dominate the neighborhood, and it has since been known for its Italian-American population. It is also known for being the Restaurant District of Trenton with many of the restaurants in the neighborhood specializing in Italian cuisine. Chambersburg also hosts the annual Italian celebration called the Feast of Madonna or the Feast of Lights, further reflecting its cultural and religious roots. In recent years, South Trenton has been experiencing a sharp rise in residents from Latin America, especially Puerto Rico. There are still large concentrations of Puerto Ricans in South Trenton. More recently, Guatemalan, Costa Rican, and Ecuadorian immigrants have come to the neighborhood. Many have set up new stores and businesses alongside Italian-Americans. Today, South Broad St. in South Trenton is home to Trenton's largest population of Latinos.

Landmarks

Landmarks in South Trenton include the First Baptist Church of Trenton located at the corner of Centre and Bridge Street which was founded in 1805. The Sun National Bank Center was completed in 1999 and hosts hundreds of events per year from hockey games to musical concerts to job fairs as well as the very popular PrimeTime Shootout showcasing some of the nation's best talent in high school basketball. The 2003 PrimeTime Shootout was the site of the highest-scoring game of LeBron James' high school career. It is located at the corner of South Broad St. and Hamilton Ave. The Trenton Thunder's stadium, Arm & Hammer Park, is located at the end of Cass Street (nicknamed "Thunder Road"). It is the Class AA-affiliate of the New York Yankees (formerly the Detroit Tigers and the Boston Red Sox) and counts Tony Clark, Carl Pavano, Trot Nixon, Nomar Garciaparra, David Eckstein, Dioner Navarro, Chen Ming-Wing, Phil Hughes, Robinson Cano, Melky Cabrera, Joba Chamberlain, Ian Kennedy, Bret Saberhagen, Derek Jeter, Bernie Williams, and Roger Clemens (the latter four as injury rehabs). There were two other Trenton minor league teams: the Trenton Senators and the Trenton Giants. The Trenton Giants once had Willie Mays (see Say Hey: The Autobiography of Willie Mays, by Willie Mays with Lou Sahadi, copyright 1988, starting at p. 46) among its former players. The New Jersey State Prison (NJSP) is also located in South Trenton mainly along 2nd St. and has a mural dedicated to the Trenton Thunder along its side that faces Thunder Road.

Another very famous landmark of South Trenton and Chambersburg is the famed and renowned Italian Peoples Bakery. Known as the "Pride of Chambersburg", it has served the neighborhood bread and Italian baked goods for over 80 years. It is still owned and operated by descendants of the same family that started the business in 1936. They now have several locations in New Jersey and Pennsylvania, but their main location is in the Heart of Chambersburg at 61-63 Butler Street, near the Italian Banquet Hall Roman Hall, and near St Joachims Catholic Church and many other Chambersburg businesses.

History

In April 1828, all South Trenton from the Assunpink southward was included in Nottingham Township. Trenton was considered the section north of the creek. Nottingham was divided, however, on April 11, 1842, the territory set off being thenceforth known as Hamilton Township.

In 1831, John A. Roebling migrated from Germany, moving to Trenton in about 1848, when he purchased some acres of land on South Broad Street where his new wire plant would be located. 

In 1851, South Trenton was annexed as part of Trenton. This also included the areas of Mill Hill and Bloomsbury. 5 years later, the part of Hamilton known as Lamberton was annexed as well. Mill Hill was the sight of some of the earliest known industrial development in Trenton. Residents were mostly working and middle class: industrial workers, clerks, shopkeepers, teachers and government workers.
Mill Hill grew rapidly in the second half of the nineteenth century, with some decline toward the end of the century. An analysis of households based on city directories of this period charts the composition of the neighborhood.

Many people consider Chambersburg part of South Trenton and call the area of the Streets of Lamberton, Cass, and Centre as "The Bottom" because of its urban area and the rise in crime along these streets.

Decline and rise in crime
The decline of the South Ward began with the building of new suburban homes in the towns surrounding Trenton in the 1950s and 1960s. Many old factories closed and businesses left the area. Many cities experienced urban decay and a rise in crime, and Trenton did as well. In 1958, a young religious fanatic who grew up in a broken home stormed St. Joachim's Church and shot three nuns, and then escaped out the back as police fired 1,000 rounds at shadows in the front window of the nunnery. Until the late 1960s crime was sporadic. A South Broad Street home was the site of three burglaries between 1966 and 1970. What made the robberies more interesting was that the building adjacent to them was the home of the Trenton Police Department. Obviously having a precinct next door did not discourage the thieves. However, South Trenton was for the most part unaffected by the Trenton Riots of 1968 while downtown was looted and burned.

Mafia
The Mafia continues to operate in the area, with most members being associates of the New Jersey Mafia and Philadelphia Mafia.

A notorious Mafia murder allegedly occurred in mid-February 1981, when the corpse of an ambitious, young, half-Irish, half-Italian Trenton gangster named Frank Stillitano was found stuffed into the trunk of a car, which was linked to his own brother-in-law 12 days later, at Philadelphia International Airport. He had been shot behind the left ear and in the left knee. Cops from Philly to Trenton to New York knew right away who killed Frank "Frankie Stale" Stillitano, 28: He was known for shaking down tavern owners and small businesses and was not a very admirable character; soldiers from the Gambino crime family made the hit to avenge Stillitano's slaying of Trenton capo Nicky Russo's son on March 24, 1979. Trenton wouldn't find out who killed Frankie Stale until May 1997, when Salvatore "Sammy the Bull" Gravano came out with a book in which he admitted killing Stillitano and 18 other mobsters, including a Trenton capo he came to admire, John "Johnny Keys" Simone.

Street gangs
The first known street gang in South Trenton was the "South Trenton River Rats" formed in the early 1960s. This group was famously described in the book Rise of the River Rat by Tony Capps as "a loose conglomeration of people with a common cause." In the Latin American areas of South Trenton, Guatemalan gangs have come to challenge the long-established dominance of the Latin Kings in South Trenton. In addition to the Latin Kings, South Trenton is home to many members of the gangs GTO (Guatemalans Taking Over), the Ñetas, MS-13, the Crips, and the Bloods. Some suspect that the Maniac Latin Disciples are trying to move in as well due to recent graffiti. Most of these divergent groups' members come to a head at the local junior high school for South Trenton, Grace A. Dunn Middle School, also known as Junior High School Number Four or simply "Jr. 4". This has played a part in making Jr. 4 one of five "persistently dangerous schools" in the State of New Jersey according to No Child Left Behind reporting from 2004 through 2006. Despite these realities, South Trenton is considered by many to be the safest neighborhood in Trenton with relatively low rates of violent crime when compared with other parts of New Jersey's capital city.

There was a sharp rise in crime during the mid-1990s, but by the mid-2000s, crime rates in South Trenton, especially the number of violent crimes, had decreased significantly along with crime rates throughout the country.

References

Former boroughs in New Jersey
Italian-American culture in New Jersey
Little Italys in the United States
Neighborhoods in Trenton, New Jersey
Populated places established in 1840
Restaurant districts and streets in the United States